Luis Gutiérrez Soto (1900–1977) was a Spanish architect. He worked primarily in Madrid.

Biography 
After earning a degree in 1923, he became Chief Architect of the Ministry of Public Instruction, delivering a profuse number of projects of schools until 1929. His first noted project was the Cine Callao (1926).

Once a follower of the rationalist architectural style, he reinvented himself during the Francoist dictatorship (1939–1975), adapting to the traditionalist aesthetics promoted by the regime, and became a representative of the neo-herrerian francoist style.

He died in Madrid on 4 February 1977. He was buried in the Mingorrubio Cemetery in El Pardo. With a period of activity spanning along six decades, he delivered over 650 projects, most of them in Madrid.

References 
Citations

Bibliography
 

1900 births
1977 deaths
20th-century Spanish architects
Burials at Mingorrubio Cemetery